BettyLou DeCroce (born November 17, 1952) is an American Republican Party politician, who served in the New Jersey General Assembly from 2012 to 2022, where she represented the 26th Legislative District.

Biography and early career 
Born and raised in Dover, DeCroce is a realtor who formerly served as the President of the firm ERA Gallo & DeCroce, Inc. She attended Berkeley College and Rutgers University.

A member of the Township Council in Mine Hill Township from 1981 to 1983, DeCroce later served on the Roxbury Township Planning Board from 1984 to 1987. In 1991, she was hired by the township to serve as its Deputy Township Manager from 1991 through 2002 and as its Township Clerk from 1988 to 2010.

In 2010, she was appointed Deputy Commissioner in the New Jersey Department of Community Affairs, a position she held until 2012. During this time, she authored the Best Practices for Municipalities, which became a statewide model for identifying efficiencies in local government for reducing property taxes.

DeCroce has served on the Morris County Joint Insurance Fund and was the North Jersey Health Insurance Fund Commissioner.

She married Alex DeCroce, who had been in the Assembly for two terms, in 1994. She currently resides in Parsippany-Troy Hills and has two sons and four grandchildren.

New Jersey Assembly 
Alex DeCroce, who had served in the Assembly since 1993, died suddenly on January 9, 2012, at the age of 75, shortly after the 214th Legislature had ended.

On January 25, 2012, BettyLou DeCroce was selected by the Morris County Republican Committee to replace him in the Assembly, defeating former Kinnelon Councilman Larry Casha by a nearly 2-1 margin. She won a November 2012 special election for the remainder of the term, defeating Democratic candidate Joseph Raich.

On June 8, 2021, DeCroce lost her reelection bid to former Pompton Lakes Councilman Christian Barranco.

Committee assignments 
Financial Institutions and Insurance
Science, Innovation and Technology
Transportation and Independent Authorities
Joint Committee on the Public Schools
New Jersey Legislative Select Oversight
Intergovernmental Relations Commission
Manufacturing Caucus

Electoral history

New Jersey Assembly

References

External links
Assemblywoman DeCroce's legislative web page, New Jersey Legislature
New Jersey Legislature financial disclosure forms:
2013 2012 2011

1952 births
Living people
Republican Party members of the New Jersey General Assembly
New Jersey city council members
People from Mine Hill Township, New Jersey
People from Parsippany-Troy Hills, New Jersey
People from Roxbury, New Jersey
Politicians from Morris County, New Jersey
Rutgers University alumni
Spouses of New Jersey politicians
Women city councillors in New Jersey
21st-century American politicians
21st-century American women politicians